Elena Brioukhovets (Russian: Елена Брюховец) is a Ukrainian former professional tennis player and an Honored Master of Sports.

Brioukhovets started her own tennis school in 2007. The school was previously based in Odessa, Ukraine, but is currently located in Ryazan, Russia.

WTA career finals

Singles: 1 (runner-up)

Doubles: 5 (3 titles, 2 runner-ups)

ITF finals

Singles: 5 (4–1)

Doubles: 16 (14–2)

References

External links

 
 
 
 Photo from 1989
 Biography on Elena Bryukhovets Tennis School site

Living people
1971 births
Soviet female tennis players
Ukrainian female tennis players
Sportspeople from Odesa
Honoured Masters of Sport of the USSR